Departure Lounge may refer to:

 Departure lounge, part of an airport
 Departure Lounge (band), a British musical group
 Departure Lounge, a 2006 novel by Chad Taylor

See also
Departure (disambiguation)